Gap junction alpha-1 protein (GJA1), also known as connexin 43 (Cx43), is a protein that in humans is encoded by the GJA1 gene on chromosome 6. As a connexin, GJA1 is a component of gap junctions, which allow for gap junction intercellular communication (GJIC) between cells to regulate cell death, proliferation, and differentiation. As a result of its function, GJA1 is implicated in many biological processes, including muscle contraction, embryonic development, inflammation, and spermatogenesis, as well as diseases, including oculodentodigital dysplasia (ODDD), heart malformations, and cancers.

Structure
GJA1 is a 43.0 kDa protein composed of 382 amino acids. GJA1 contains a long C-terminal tail, an N-terminal domain, and multiple transmembrane domains. The protein passes through the phospholipid bilayer four times, leaving its C- and N-terminals exposed to the cytoplasm. The C-terminal tail is composed of 50 amino acids and includes post-translational modification sites, as well as binding sites for transcription factors, cytoskeleton elements, and other proteins. As a result, the C-terminal tail is central to functions such as regulating pH gating and channel assembly. Notably, the DNA region of the GJA1 gene encoding this tail is highly conserved, indicating that it is either resistant to mutations or becomes lethal when mutated. Meanwhile, the N-terminal domain is involved in channel gating and oligomerization and, thus, may control the switch between the channel's open and closed states. The transmembrane domains form the gap junction channel while the extracellular loops facilitate proper channel docking. Moreover, two extracellular loops form disulfide bonds that interact with two hexamers to form a complete gap junction channel.

The connexin-43 internal ribosome entry site is an RNA element present in the 5' UTR of the mRNA of GJA1. This internal ribosome entry site (IRES) allows cap independent translation during conditions such as heat shock and stress.

Function 

As a member of the connexin family, GJA1 is a component of gap junctions, which are intercellular channels that connect adjacent cells to permit the exchange of low molecular weight molecules, such as small ions and secondary messengers, to maintain homeostasis.

GJA1 is the most ubiquitously expressed connexin and is detected in most cell types.
It is the major protein in heart gap junctions and is purported to play a crucial role in the synchronized contraction of the heart. Despite its key role in the heart and other vital organs, GJA1 has a short half-life (only two to four hours), indicating that the protein undergoes daily turnover in the heart and may be highly abundant or compensated with other connexins. 
GJA1 is also largely involved in embryonic development. For instance, transforming growth factor-beta 1 (TGF-β1) was observed to induce GJA1 expression via the Smad and ERK1/2 signaling pathways, resulting in trophoblast cell differentiation into the placenta.

Furthermore, GJA1 is expressed in many immune cells, such as eosinophils and T cells, where its gap junction function promotes the maturation and activation of these cells and, by extension, the cross-communication necessary to mount an inflammatory response.

In addition, GJA1 can be found in the Leydig cells and seminiferous tubules between Sertoli cells and spermatogonia or primary spermatocytes, where it plays a key role in spermatogenesis and testis development through controlling the tight junction proteins in the blood-testis barrier.

While it is a channel protein, GJA1 can also perform channel-independent functions. In the cytoplasm, the protein regulates the microtubule network and, by extension, cell migration and polarity. This function has been observed in brain and heart development, as well as wound-healing in endothelial cells. GJA1 has also been observed to localize to the mitochondria, where it promotes cell survival by downregulating the intrinsic apoptotic pathway during conditions of oxidative stress.

Clinical significance 
Mutations in this gene have been associated with ODDD; craniometaphyseal dysplasia; sudden infant death syndrome, which is linked to cardiac arrhythmia; Hallermann–Streiff syndrome; and heart malformations, such as viscero-atrial heterotaxia. There have also been a few cases of reported hearing loss and skin disorders unrelated to ODDD. Ultimately, GJA1 has low tolerance for deviations from its original sequence, with mutations resulting in loss- or gain-of-channel function that lead to disease phenotypes. It is paradoxical, however, that patients with an array of somatic mutations in GJA1 most often do not present with cardiac arrhythmias, even though connexin-43 is the most abundant protein forming gap junctional pores in cardiomyocytes and are essential for normal action potential propagation.

Notably, GJA1 expression has been associated with a wide variety of cancers, including nasopharyngeal carcinoma, meningioma, hemangiopericytoma, liver tumor, colon cancer, esophageal cancer, breast cancer, mesothelioma, glioblastoma, lung cancer, adrenocortical tumors, renal cell cancer, cervical carcinoma, ovarian carcinoma, endometrial carcinoma, prostate cancer, thyroid carcinoma, and testicular cancer. Its role in controlling cell motility and polarity was thought to contribute to cancer development and metastasis, though its role as a gap junction protein may also be involved. Moreover, the cytoprotective effects of this protein can promote tumor cell survival in radiotherapy treatments, while silencing its gene increases radiosensitivity. As a result, GJA1 may serve as a target for improving the success of radiotherapeutic treatment of cancer. As a biomarker, GJA1 could also be used to screen young males for risk of testis cancer.

The thyroid hormone triiodothyronine (T3) downregulates the expression of GJA1. This is assumed to be a key mechanism why the conduction velocity in myocardial tissue is reduced in thyrotoxicosis, thereby promoting cardiac arrhythmia.

Currently, only rotigaptide, an antiarrhythmic peptide-based drug, and its derivatives, such as danegaptide, have reached clinical trials for treating cardiac pathologies by enhancing GJA1 expression. Alternatively, drugs could target complementary connexins, such as Cx40, which function similarly to GJA1. However, both approaches still require a system to target the diseased tissue to avoid inducing developmental abnormalities elsewhere. Thus, a more effective approach entails designing a miRNA through antisense oligonucleotides, transfection, or infection to knock down only mutant GJA1 mRNA, thus allowing the expression of wildtype GJA1 and retaining normal phenotype.

Interactions 
Gap junction protein, alpha 1 has been shown to interact with:
Cx37,
Cx40,
Cx45,
MAPK7,
Caveolin 1,
Tight junction protein 1
CSNK1D, and
PTPmu (PTPRM).

See also 
 Connexin
 Hypoplastic left heart syndrome

References

Further reading

External links
 

Cis-regulatory RNA elements
Connexins